Esther  Ku is a comedian, television personality and actress. Ku was a cast member on the MTV shows Girl Code and Wild 'N Out. She was a finalist of Last Comic Standing, Showtime’s AVN Awards Host, SAG Actor, host of Ku and the Gang Podcast.

Career
Ku was a featured performer at the New York Underground Comedy Festival and the Boston International Comedy Festival. 

In 2008, Ku was the only female comedian from New York City to advance to the Las Vegas Semi-Finals of NBC’s Last Comic Standing, becoming one of the top-ten finalists in Hollywood. Six months later, she was chosen as a finalist in the Hottest Funniest Chick Contest on the Howard Stern Show.

On July 29, 2015, Ku was a guest on the Joe Rogan Experience podcast episode #676. In 2017, she was a cast member on next-gen female comedy sketch called Sorry Not Sorry on Go90.com.

On January 28, Ku hosted the 2019 AVN Awards Show for Showtime. Cardi B was the musical guest, making this the first all-female-hosts line-up ever. Ku opened for Brian Regan in Florida at Hard Rock Live arena on December 8, 2021.

She was the host of her own podcast—Ku and the Gang, a pun on Kool and the Gang—from 2016 to 2018.

Filmography

References

External links
 

American film actresses
American television actresses
American actresses of Korean descent
American women comedians
Last Comic Standing contestants
Living people
People from Chicago
Comedians from Illinois
21st-century American actresses
21st-century American comedians
Year of birth missing (living people)